The Together Party was an Australian political party founded in 2018. It advocated policies to restore "Government in the public interest".

Founder Mark Swivel is a lawyer, performer and writer based in Mullumbimby, New South Wales. He is the company secretary at Enova Energy, and an Ambassador for the microfinance non-profit Good Return. He is one of the party's three candidates for senators to represent New South Wales at the 2019 Australian federal election.

History
The Together Party was registered on 4 April 2019. The 550 minimum initial membership requirement was met within a period of several weeks through word-of-mouth on social media.

The Together Party fielded three candidates to represent New South Wales in the Australian Senate at the 2019 Australian federal election: Mark Swivel, Belinda Kinkead, engineer, and Kate McDowell, writer and performer. The party polled 6,127 votes, a total of 0.13% of the state's Senate vote.

The party was deregistered on 30 June 2021 for failing to meet the requirements of having 500 members.

Manifesto
The Together Party says it campaigns for the restoration of Government in the public interest, as a constructive force for positive change across Australian society.

Policies
The Together Party says it has policies that aim to make three broad changes:
 Re-prioritise taxation and government spending to better invest in education, renewables, small business, health, and climate.
 Bolster the people's voice, agency for Indigenous Australians, NGOs, the arts, the representation of women in parliament, workers’ rights, and corporate social responsibility.
 Build greater accountability in government through transparent governing (including dealings with businesses, consultants, lobbyists), strengthening the public service, re-nationalising failing NGO service providers, establishing anti-corruption and water allocation watchdogs, and moving Australia towards becoming a republic.

References

Defunct political parties in Australia
Political parties established in 2019
2019 establishments in Australia